Jean Millar Valentine, later Jean Millar Rooke (7 July 1924 – 17 May 2019) was an operator of the bombe decryption device in Hut 11 at Bletchley Park in England, designed by Alan Turing and others during World War II. She was a member of the "Wrens" (Women's Royal Naval Service, WRNS).

Life
Born in Perth, Scotland in 1924, she was one of thousands of women who worked at Bletchley Park. During this time, she lived in Steeple Claydon in Buckinghamshire. She started working on 15 shillings (75 pence) a week. Along with her co-workers, she remained quiet about her war work until the mid-1970s.

More recently, Jean Valentine has been involved with the reconstruction of the bombe at Bletchley Park Museum, completed in 2006.
In 2006, she said: "Unless people come pouring through the doors, a vital piece of history is lost. The more we can educate them, the better."
She demonstrates the reconstructed bombe at the Bletchley Park Museum and leads tours there. She participated in a reunion at Bletchley Park in 2009.

On 24 June 2012, Jean Valentine spoke on her wartime experiences at Bletchley Park and elsewhere as part of a Turing's Worlds event to celebrate the centenary of the birth of Alan Turing, organized by the Department for Continuing Education's Rewley House at Oxford University in cooperation with the British Society for the History of Mathematics (BSHM).

Valentine mentioned during an interview conducted by Joe Miller for the BBC, how moving down to London was a new experience for her, as she had never been out of Scotland up to that point. Valentine worked for eight hours during the day at Bletchley Park and mentioned how no one would ever talk about what they had done or would be doing when outside of Bletchley Park. 
Valentine worked in Hut 11 as has been previously mentioned, recalling how there would be "five machines within the hut, ten girls and one petty officer that would be in charge of the telephone". Valentine latterly lived in Henley, Oxfordshire and died in May 2019 at the age of 94.

See also
 List of people associated with Bletchley Park

References

 

1924 births
2019 deaths
Bletchley Park people
Bletchley Park women
British women in World War II
Museum people
People from Perth, Scotland
Royal Navy personnel of World War II
Tour guides
Women's Royal Naval Service personnel of World War II